Rosete may refer to:
 Héctor Rosete, a football player
 Jimena Navarrete Rosete (born 1988), a Mexican model
 Maira Rosete, a dancer at the 2005 Southeast Asian Games dancesport competition
 Martin Rosete (born 1980), a Spanish film director and publicist
 Melanie Grace Rosete Bennett, the 2002 Canadian representative to Miss Earth
 Miguel Julio Rosete (born 1991), a Colombian football player
 Sarah Rosete, a member of R&B girl group Electrik Red
 A synonym for the Portuguese Baga grape variety
Rufete (grape), another Portuguese grape variety with Rosete as a synonym
 A barangay in San Felipe, Zambales Province, Philippines

See also
 Rosette (disambiguation), about words with similar spelling
 Rosas (surname), of which Rosete is a spelling variation